Pileri is a small village in Cyprus, located 4 km east of Agios Ermolaos and 4 km west of Kiomourtzou. It is under the control of Northern Cyprus. In 2011, its population was  228.

References

Communities in Kyrenia District
Populated places in Girne District